The 2017 Women's Cricket Super League, or 2017 Kia Super League for sponsorship reasons, was the second season of the Women's Cricket Super League (WCSL), a semi-professional women's cricket competition in England and Wales. The competition, run by the England and Wales Cricket Board (ECB), consisted of six franchise teams playing in a Twenty20 format. The Southern Vipers were the defending champions, but lost in the final to Western Storm.

Competition format
Six teams competed for the T20 title which took place between 10 August and 1 September 2017. The six teams played each other once in a round robin format; followed by a finals day at the County Cricket Ground, Hove.

Teams

Points table

Fixtures

League stage

Semi-final

Final

Statistics
 Highest score by a team: Southern Vipers – 180/2 (20 overs) v Loughborough Lightning (15 August).
 Lowest score by a team: Western Storm – 70 (18.5 overs) v Southern Vipers (10 August).
 Top score by an individual: Suzie Bates – 119* (72) v Loughborough Lightning (15 August).
 Best bowling figures by an individual: Rene Farrell – 5/26 (4 overs) v Lancashire Thunder (16 August).

Most runs

Source: ESPNCricinfo

Most wickets

Source: ESPNCricinfo

References

External links
 Tournament homepage on ESPN Cricinfo

2017
!